He Art Museum, located in Shunde, Foshan, Guangdong Province, China, He Art Museum (or HEM, Chinese: 和美术馆) is a privately funded non-profit museum designed by Pritzker Prize winner Tadao Ando.

Meaning harmony, balance and mixture, the museum’s name “He” (Chinese: 和) takes the family name of its founder, He Jianfeng, son of Midea Group founder He Xiangjian.

Architecture 
The overall design philosophy of the architecture is the idea of harmony. Through the double-helix staircase made with concrete, it presents various circles in different dynamics within the space.

Exhibition 
 From the Mudane World – HEM Inaugural Exhibition
 Museum Collection Exhibition – including Chinese and international contemporary and modern artworks.

References

External links 
 

Museums in Foshan
Tadao Ando buildings
Art museums and galleries in China
Museums established in 2020